is a former Japanese football player. His younger brother Masato is also a former footballer.

Playing career
Koga was born in Shizuoka Prefecture on April 30, 1969. After graduating from Juntendo University, he joined Japan Football League club Yamaha Motors (later Júbilo Iwata) in 1992. He played many matches first season and the club won the champions in 1992 and the 2nd place in 1993. The club was promoted to J1 League from 1994. From 1994, he became a regular player as right side back from and the club won the champions 1997 J1 League and 1998 J.League Cup. In Asia, the club also won the champions 1998–99 Asian Club Championship. In 1999, although the club won the champions 1999 J1 League, his opportunity to play decreased behind Kiyokazu Kudo. In 2000, he moved to across town to the Júbilo rivals Shimizu S-Pulse. From 2001, he became a regular player as left defender of three backs defense and the club won the champions 2001 Emperor's Cup. In Asia, the club won the champions in 1999–00 and the 3rd place in 2000–01 Asian Cup Winners' Cup. At 3rd place match in 2000–01, he scored an opening goal. In 2003, he moved to Cerezo Osaka and he retired end of 2003 season.

Coaching career
After retirement, Koga started coaching career at Cerezo Osaka in 2004. In 2011, he signed with Football Association of Singapore as the Head Coach of the National Football Academy U-17 team in Singapore. The NFA U-17 team had taken part in the Lion City Cup and was also the Singapore representative that won the bronze medal at the first Youth Olympic Games.

Club statistics

References

External links

1969 births
Living people
Juntendo University alumni
Association football people from Shizuoka Prefecture
Japanese footballers
J1 League players
Japan Football League (1992–1998) players
Júbilo Iwata players
Shimizu S-Pulse players
Cerezo Osaka players
Association football defenders